Probus may refer to:

People
 Marcus Valerius Probus (c. 20/30–105 AD), Roman grammarian
 Marcus Pomponius Maecius Probus, consul in 228
 Probus (emperor), Roman Emperor (276–282)
 Probus of Byzantium (–306), Bishop of Byzantium from 293 to 306
 Saint Probus of Side, martyr of the Diocletian persecution (c. 304 AD)
 Sextus Claudius Petronius Probus (floruit 358–390), a powerful Roman senator of the fourth century
 Anicius Petronius Probus, Roman consul in 406
 Probus, martyr of 437
 Probus (son of Magnus), Gallo-Roman senator of the fifth century
 Anicius Probus (fl. 459), a Roman senator of the 5th century
 Probus (consul 502), consul in 502
 Probus (consul 513), Flavius Probus, consul in 513
 Anastasius (consul 517), Flavius Anastasius Paulus Probus Sabinianus Pompeius, consul in 517
 Flavius Anicius Probus Iunior, consul in 525
 Rufius Gennadius Probus Orestes, consul in 530
 Henryk IV Probus (c. 1258–1290), High Duke of Polan
 Probus Brittanicus, pseudonym of Samuel Johnson (1709–1784), English lexicographer, playwright and critic
 Probus, pseudonym of Charlotte Forman (1715–1787), Anglo-Irish journalist
 Probus, pseudonym of Thomas Chatterton (1752–1770), English poet
 Probus, pseudonym of Nancy H. Adsit (1825–1902), art educator

Other uses
Probus, Cornwall, a village near Truro in the UK
Probus: International Journal of Latin and Romance Linguistics
Probus Clubs, an international movement catering to the interests of retired or semi-retired professional or business people
Probus Management, a former bus company in the UK, now part of Go West Midlands